Miroslava Šternová Beková (26 February  – 9 March 1955), known professionally as Miroslava Stern, was a Czechoslovak-Mexican actress.

Biography
Born Miroslava Šternová Beková in Prague, Czechoslovakia, Miroslava moved to Mexico as a child with her mother and adoptive Jewish father in 1941, seeking to escape war in their native country. After winning a national beauty contest, Miroslava began to study acting. She worked steadily in films produced in Mexico, from 1946 to 1955, as well as three Hollywood films during that period.

Miroslava filmed Ensayo de un crimen (The Criminal Life of Archibaldo de la Cruz) in 1955, directed by Luis Buñuel. On March 9 of that year, soon after filming ended (the film was released in May), Miroslava committed suicide by overdosing on sleeping pills. Her body was found lying outstretched over her bed, she had a portrait of bullfighter Luis Miguel Dominguín in one hand. Actress Katy Jurado said she was one of the first to find the body. According to Jurado, the picture that Miroslava had between her hands was of Mexican comedian Cantinflas, but the artistic manager Fanny Schatz exchanged the photo for that of the Spanish bullfighter Luis Miguel Dominguín. Another source states that her body was found by actress Ninón Sevilla. Miroslava's friends stated her suicide was due to unrequited love for Dominguín, who had recently married Italian actress Lucia Bosè. Others claimed that her unrequited love was for Cantinflas. Despite any evidence to support it, a rumor persisted that she died in a plane crash when traveling with Mexican businessman Jorge Pasquel, the day before her suicide.

In his 1983 autobiography, Mon dernier soupir (My Last Breath), Buñuel called Miroslava's cremation  following her suicide ironic, when compared to a scene in Ensayo de un crimen, her last film, in which the protagonist cremates a wax reproduction of her character. Her life is the subject of a short story by Guadalupe Loaeza, which was adapted by Alejandro Pelayo for his 1992 Mexican film called Miroslava, starring Arielle Dombasle.

Filmography

Mexico

Documentaries
 El charro inmortal (1955)
 Torero (1956)

Feature films

 Tragic Wedding (1946) as Amparo
 Five Faces of Woman (1947) as Beatriz
 Fly Away, Young Man! (1947) as María
 Juan Charrasqueado (1947) as María
 Nocturne of Love (1948) as Marta Reyes
 Adventure in the Night (1948) as Elena
 Adventures of Casanova (1948) as Cassandra's sister
 Secreto entre mujeres (1948) as Claudia
 La liga de las muchachas (1949) as Marta
 La posesión (1949) as Rosaura
 La casa chica (1950) as Lucila del Castillo
 La muerte enamorada (1950) as Tacia, la muerte
 Monte de piedad (1950) as Elena
 Streetwalker (1951) as Elena
 Cárcel de mujeres (1951) as Evangelina Ocampo
 Ella y yo (1951) as Irene Garza
 El puerto de los siete vicios (1951) as Colomba
 Dos caras tiene el destino (1951) as Anita
 The Magnificent Beast (1952) as Meche
 Sueños de gloria (1952) as Elsa
 Las tres perfectas casadas (1952) as Leopoldina
 Música, mujeres y amor (1952) as Elisa Méndez
 Más fuerte que el amor (1953) as Bárbara
 El monstruo resucitado (1953) as Nora
 Reportaje (1953) as Nurse
 La visita que no tocó el timbre (1954) as Emma
 Escuela de vagabundos (1954) as Susana o Susi
 Ensayo de un crimen (1955) as Lavinia

United States
 Adventures of Casanova (1948) as Cassandra's sister
 The Brave Bulls (1951) as Linda de Calderón
 Stranger on Horseback (1955) as Amy Lee Bannerman

See also
 Foreign-born artists in Mexico

References

Sources

External links
 
 
 
 Miroslava Stern on the cover of Life magazine; July 10, 1950

Actresses from Prague
Barbiturates-related deaths
Czechoslovak emigrants to Mexico
Czech film actresses
Drug-related suicides in Mexico
Female suicides
Golden Age of Mexican cinema
Mexican film actresses
Mexican Jews
People with mood disorders
1920s births
1955 suicides
20th-century Mexican actresses
Jewish actresses